Sureshjan (also Romanized as Sūreshjān, Sooresh Jan, and Sūrshjān) is a city in Laran District of Shahrekord County, Chaharmahal and Bakhtiari province, Iran. At the 2006 census, its population was 11,124 in 2,604 households. The following census in 2011 counted 11,407 people in 2,122 households. The latest census in 2016 showed a population of 12,308 people in 3,595 households. The city is populated by Lurs.

References 

Shahrekord County

Cities in Chaharmahal and Bakhtiari Province

Populated places in Chaharmahal and Bakhtiari Province

Populated places in Shahr-e Kord County

Luri settlements in Chaharmahal and Bakhtiari Province